"Second Opinion" is the 33rd episode of the HBO original series The Sopranos and the seventh of the show's third season. It was written by Lawrence Konner and directed by Tim Van Patten, and originally aired on April 8, 2001.

Starring
 James Gandolfini as Tony Soprano
 Lorraine Bracco as Dr. Jennifer Melfi 
 Edie Falco as Carmela Soprano
 Michael Imperioli as Christopher Moltisanti
 Dominic Chianese as Corrado Soprano, Jr. 
 Steven Van Zandt as Silvio Dante 
 Tony Sirico as Paulie Gualtieri
 Robert Iler as Anthony Soprano, Jr. 
 Jamie-Lynn Sigler as Meadow Soprano
 Drea de Matteo as Adriana La Cerva 
 Aida Turturro as Janice Soprano *
 Federico Castelluccio as Furio Giunta
 Steven R. Schirripa as Bobby Baccalieri

* = credit only

Guest starring
 Tom Aldredge as Hugh De Angelis
 Sully Boyar as Dr. Krakower
 Dan Grimaldi as Patsy Parisi
 Tony Hale as RN Collins
 Toni Kalem as Angie Bonpensiero
 Sam McMurray as Dr. John Kennedy
 Suzanne Shepherd as Mary De Angelis
 Frank Wood as Dean Ross

Synopsis
There is rising tension between Christopher and Paulie. As a newly made man, Chris is liable to be strip-searched. Paulie makes him strip in the back room of the Bada Bing and makes fun of his penis size. Late one night he and Patsy go to Chris's apartment and search his belongings. Chris sees Paulie sniffing Adriana's panties. Tony dismisses Chris's complaint. Paulie warns him never to complain about him again to the "big man". But then Paulie shows him a Big Mouth Billy Bass and they laugh together, friends again. 
 
Carmela runs into Angie Bonpensiero at a supermarket. Angie says that, though Tony is helping her financially, things are hard and she cannot afford an operation for her poodle. Carmela tells Tony, who goes to Angie's home and sees that she has a new Cadillac. He smashes its windows and lights with a baseball bat and tells her she should speak about money only to him.

Junior has complete faith in his surgeon, Dr. John Kennedy. He does not know that Kennedy erred, removing too little of the tissue surrounding his tumor. When Kennedy says he would like to perform further surgery, Junior agrees, but Tony believes Junior is too much impressed by the doctor's name. They consult another doctor, who recommends that Junior receive chemotherapy treatments. A tumor board review is called, and they reach the same conclusion. Junior undergoes chemo and suffers distressing side effects. He longs to speak to Kennedy, who does not return his calls. Tony and Furio confront Kennedy on his golf course and bribe and intimidate him into giving Junior his attention. Kennedy appears at the hospital, warmly greets Junior, reassures him, and gives him his home phone number. Junior beams with happiness.

Carmela has lunch with a dean from Columbia, Meadow's university. Tony refuses to go, saying that the purpose is to extort money. He will donate $5,000, no more. The dean tells her that his research indicates that the Sopranos could contribute $50,000.

Carmela attends a session alone with Dr. Melfi on a day when Tony does not want to go. She stresses that she does not need therapy herself, but she makes an appointment with the therapist Melfi recommends. This therapist, Dr. Krakower, makes judgments. When he has learned about her situation, he speaks the word "Mafia" and tells her she should take the children and go, which he views as the only way to find peace. He will not accept payment for the session, stating that he does not want "blood money."

Emotionally overwhelmed, Carmela lies on a sofa at home, wrapped in a blanket. When Tony returns, she tells him that she has spoken to the dean on the phone, and promised $50,000. He balks, but she says this is something he must do for her. He sees that he must.

Title reference
 Uncle Junior seeks a second opinion from another doctor for his cancer treatment.
 The title could also refer to Carmela receiving a second opinion on her relationship with Tony, from Dr. Krakower.

Other cultural references
 Dr. Krakower tells Carmela that Tony should read Crime and Punishment, by Fyodor Dostoevsky, after turning himself in for his crimes.
 When Christopher brings home shoes for Adriana, she's watching the "Wallpaper" episode of Everybody Loves Raymond.
 Adriana tells Christopher that she once performed oral sex on Penn Jillette of Penn and Teller fame in a public restroom.
 The episode features the toy Big Mouth Billy Bass, a popular singing animatronic fish from the late 1990s that most of Tony's crew gets a kick out of. However, Tony is reminded too strongly of his best friend whom he was forced to kill (and more specifically, the dream where Pussy appeared to him as a talking fish).
 Junior refers to a senior health issue of the magazine U.S. News & World Report when chastising Bobby for not asking better questions of his doctor.

Music
 The song played when Carmela visits Meadow at Columbia and, again, over the end credits is a live version of "Black Books" by Nils Lofgren.
 A remix of "Mysterious Ways" by U2 is playing in the Bing when Tony beats up Georgie with the Billy Bass.
 The songs sung by the Big Mouth Billy Bass are "Take Me to the River" by Al Green and "Y.M.C.A." by The Village People. "Y.M.C.A." was a specially-recorded version for the toy by The Sopranos prop department after the originally planned song, "Don't Worry, Be Happy" by Bobby McFerrin, was not allowed to be licensed for the show by McFerrin, who disliked the adult content of the TV series.
Bach's Goldberg Variations is playing when Carmela has lunch with the dean of Columbia University.

Awards
Edie Falco won her second Primetime Emmy Award for Outstanding Lead Actress in a Drama Series for her performance in this episode.

References

External links
"Second Opinion" at HBO

The Sopranos (season 3) episodes
2001 American television episodes
Television episodes directed by Tim Van Patten